Limnohabitans parvus is a Gram-negative, aerobic, oxidase- and catalase-positive, unpigmented, short-rod-shaped, nonmotile bacterium from the genus  Limnohabitans, which was isolated with Limnohabitans planktonicus from the mesoeutrophic freshwater reservoir in Římov in the Czech Republic.

References

External links
Type strain of Limnohabitans parvus at BacDive -  the Bacterial Diversity Metadatabase

Comamonadaceae